The West Virginia LPGA Classic was a golf tournament on the LPGA Tour from 1974 to 1984. It was played at the Speidel Golf Club in Wheeling, West Virginia.

Winners
West Virginia LPGA Classic
1984 Alice Miller
1983 Alice Miller
1982 Hollis Stacy

West Virginia Bank Classic
1981 Hollis Stacy

West Virginia LPGA Classic
1980 Sandra Post

Wheeling Classic
1979 Debbie Massey
1978 Jane Blalock
1977 Debbie Austin
1976 Jane Blalock

Wheeling Ladies Classic
1975 Susie McAllister
1974 Carole Jo Skala

References

External links
Speidel Golf Club

Former LPGA Tour events
Golf in West Virginia
Recurring sporting events established in 1974
Recurring sporting events disestablished in 1984
1974 establishments in West Virginia
1984 disestablishments in West Virginia
Sports in Wheeling, West Virginia
History of women in West Virginia